Air Vice-Marshal Alastair Norman Crawford Reid,  is a senior Royal Air Force officer and medical doctor.

RAF career
Educated at the University of Glasgow, Reid served as general practitioner in the National Health Service before joining the Royal Air Force in 1993. He became Air Officer Medical Operations, No. 38 Group in April 2014, Head Medical Strategy, Policy and Personnel, Headquarters Surgeon General in June 2016 and Defence Medical Director, Headquarters Surgeon General in June 2018. Reid was acting Surgeon General after Lieutenant General Martin Bricknell.

He was appointed Companion of the Order of the Bath (CB) in the 2020 New Year Honours.

References

Alumni of the University of Glasgow
Companions of the Order of the Bath
Living people
Royal Air Force air marshals
Royal Air Force Medical Service officers
Year of birth missing (living people)